Michał Andrzej Łogosz (born 23 November 1977) is a Polish badminton player from Litpol-Malow Suwałki club.  He was named best sportsman in Płock in 1995.

Career 
Łogosz started playing badminton when he was in primary school, and in 1992, he representing his club at the national league tournament. In 2000, he was selected to join the national team.

Łogosz competed in badminton at the 2000 Summer Olympics and in 2004 Summer Olympics, both times in men's doubles with partner Robert Mateusiak. In 2000, they defeated David Bamford and Peter Blackburn of Australia in the first round, but lost in the round of 16 to Simon Archer and Nathan Robertson of United Kingdom. In 2004, they defeated Tri Kush Aryanto and Sigit Budiarto of Indonesia in the first round, before being defeated in the round of 16 by Kim Dong-moon and Ha Tae-kwon of Korea.

Łogosz and Mateusiak won bronze medals at the European Championships in 2000, 2002, 2004 and 2006.

At the 2012 Summer Olympics, he competed with Adam Cwalina in the men's doubles, but was forced to retire from the event with an Achilles injury.

Achievements

European Championships 
Men's doubles

BWF Grand Prix 
The BWF Grand Prix had two levels, the Grand Prix and Grand Prix Gold. It was a series of badminton tournaments sanctioned by the Badminton World Federation (BWF) and played between 2007 and 2017. The World Badminton Grand Prix was sanctioned by the International Badminton Federation from 1983 to 2006.

Men's doubles

 BWF Grand Prix Gold tournament
 BWF & IBF Grand Prix tournament

BWF International Challenge/Series/European Circuit 
Men's doubles

Mixed doubles

  BWF International Challenge tournament
  BWF International Series/ European Circuit tournament

References

External links 
 
 IBF Player Profile

1977 births
Living people
Sportspeople from Płock
Polish male badminton players
Badminton players at the 2000 Summer Olympics
Badminton players at the 2004 Summer Olympics
Badminton players at the 2008 Summer Olympics
Badminton players at the 2012 Summer Olympics
Olympic badminton players of Poland